Sean James Pronger (born November 30, 1972) is a Canadian former professional ice hockey player who grew up in Dryden, Ontario, and played in the National Hockey League from 1995 to 2004. He played for the following teams: Mighty Ducks of Anaheim, Pittsburgh Penguins, New York Rangers, Los Angeles Kings, Boston Bruins, Columbus Blue Jackets and Vancouver Canucks, having been drafted 51st overall by Vancouver in 1991. In 260 regular-season games, he scored 23 goals and 36 assists for 59 points, picking up 159 penalty minutes. He is the older brother of Chris Pronger. Their mother Eila Pronger is from Pori, Finland.

Career statistics

Regular season and playoffs

Transactions
June 22, 1991 - Drafted by the Vancouver Canucks in the 3rd round, 51st overall, in the 1991 NHL Entry Draft.
February 14, 1995 - Signed as a free agent with the Mighty Ducks of Anaheim
March 24, 1998 - Traded by the Mighty Ducks of Anaheim to the Pittsburgh Penguins in exchange for Patrick Lalime.
November 25, 1998 - Traded by the Pittsburgh Penguins, along with Petr Nedvěd and Chris Tamer, to the New York Rangers in exchange for Alexei Kovalev and Harry York.
February 12, 1999 - Traded by the New York Rangers to the Los Angeles Kings in exchange for Eric Lacroix.
August 25, 1999 - Signed as a free agent with the Boston Bruins.
December 5, 2000 - Traded by the Boston Bruins to the New York Islanders in exchange for future considerations.
May 18, 2001 - Claimed on waivers by the Columbus Blue Jackets from the New York Islanders.
October 30, 2003 - Traded by the Columbus Blue Jackets to the Vancouver Canucks in exchange for Zenith Komarniski.

External links

1972 births
Baltimore Bandits players
Boston Bruins players
Bowling Green Falcons men's ice hockey players
Canadian ice hockey centres
Canadian people of Finnish descent
Columbus Blue Jackets players
Frankfurt Lions players
Greensboro Monarchs players
Houston Aeros (1994–2013) players
Ice hockey people from Ontario
Sportspeople from Thunder Bay
Knoxville Cherokees players
Living people
Los Angeles Kings players
Manitoba Moose players
Manitoba Moose (IHL) players
Mighty Ducks of Anaheim players
New York Rangers players
People from Dryden, Ontario
Pittsburgh Penguins players
Providence Bruins players
San Diego Gulls (IHL) players
Syracuse Crunch players
Thunder Bay Flyers players
Vancouver Canucks draft picks
Vancouver Canucks players
Canadian expatriate ice hockey players in Germany
Canadian expatriate ice hockey players in the United States